The 1957 National Football League draft had its first four rounds held on November 26, 1956, at the Warwick Hotel in Philadelphia and its final twenty-six rounds on January 31, 1957 at the Bellevue-Stratford Hotel also in Philadelphia.

This was the 11th year that the first overall pick was a bonus pick determined by lottery. With the previous ten winners ineligible from the draw, only the Chicago Cardinals and the Green Bay Packers had an equal chance of winning. The draft lottery was won by Green Bay, who selected halfback Paul Hornung.

Player selections

Round one

Round two

Round three

Round four

Round five

Round six

Round seven

Round eight

Round nine

Round ten

Round eleven

Round twelve

Round thirteen

Round fourteen

Round fifteen

Round sixteen

Round seventeen

Round eighteen

Round nineteen

Round twenty

Round twenty-one

Round twenty-two

Round twenty-three

Round twenty-four

Round twenty-five

Round twenty-six

Round twenty-seven

Round twenty-eight

Round twenty-nine

Round thirty

Hall of Famers
 Jim Brown, fullback from Syracuse taken 1st round 6th overall by the Cleveland Browns.
Inducted: Professional Football Hall of Fame class of 1971.
  Jim Parker, guard from Ohio State taken 1st round 8th overall by the Baltimore Colts.
Inducted: Professional Football Hall of Fame class of 1973.
 Sonny Jurgensen, quarterback from Duke taken 4th round 43rd overall by the Philadelphia Eagles.
Inducted: Professional Football Hall of Fame class of 1983.
 Paul Hornung,  running back from Notre Dame taken 1st round 1st overall by the Green Bay Packers.
Inducted: Professional Football Hall of Fame class of 1986.
 Len Dawson, quarterback from Purdue taken 1st round 5th overall by the Pittsburgh Steelers.
Inducted: Professional Football Hall of Fame class of 1987.
 Don Maynard, wide receiver from Texas Western taken 9th round 109th overall by the New York Giants.
Inducted: Professional Football Hall of Fame class of 1987.
 Henry Jordan, defensive tackle from Virginia taken 5th round 52nd overall by the Cleveland Browns.
Inducted: Professional Football Hall of Fame class of 1995.
 Tommy McDonald, wide receiver from Oklahoma taken 3rd round 31st overall by the Philadelphia Eagles.
Inducted: Professional Football Hall of Fame class of 1998.
 Gene Hickerson, offensive guard from the University of Mississippi taken 7th round 78th overall by the Cleveland Browns.
Inducted: Professional Football Hall of Fame class of 2007.

Notable undrafted players

References

External links
 NFL.com – 1957 Draft
 databaseFootball.com – 1957 Draft
 Pro Football Hall of Fame

National Football League Draft
Draft
NFL Draft
NFL Draft
1950s in Philadelphia
American football in Philadelphia
Events in Philadelphia
NFL Draft
NFL Draft